Timothy Christian Hauck (born December 20, 1966) is a former American football safety in the National Football League (NFL). He most recently was the safeties coach for the Philadelphia Eagles of the National Football League (NFL).

Playing career
Hauck is the son of the former Big Timber high school coach. Originally, he signed with University of Portland where he was all conference. Then, he transferred to University of Montana where he became defensive MVP for the Big Sky conference. After his senior year at Montana, he went undrafted, but claimed to have received 10 offers following the draft. He signed with the New England Patriots where he made the roster and spent one season.

Hauck had a long and fairly successful NFL playing career. In 1999 with the Philadelphia Eagles, Hauck replaced Mike Zordich as the starting strong-side safety, forming a tandem with Brian Dawkins. In 2000, Hauck was replaced by Damon Moore, but he remained with the Eagles as a reserve safety until the end of the 2001 season. He is perhaps best remembered as the player who tackled Dallas Cowboys wide receiver Michael Irvin, and caused his career-ending spinal cord injury in 1999.

Coaching career
Hauck worked coaching the defensive secondary for the University of Montana. In 2008, he was hired by UCLA to coach the team's defensive secondary. In 2009, Hauck went to the NFL's Tennessee Titans to coach their defensive secondary.

On January 23, 2012, the Cleveland Browns announced the hiring of Hauck as the team's defensive backs coach. On February 13, 2013, UNLV announced the hiring of Hauck as the team's new defensive coordinator and cornerbacks coach under his brother, head coach Bobby Hauck. He was hired by the Eagles as the team's safeties coach on January 20, 2016. Hauck won his first Super Bowl ring when the Eagles defeated the New England Patriots in Super Bowl LII.

References

External links
Tim Hauck at Montana Grizzlies Hall of Fame

1966 births
Living people
American football safeties
Denver Broncos players
Green Bay Packers players
Indianapolis Colts players
Montana Grizzlies football players
New England Patriots players
Players of American football from Montana
Philadelphia Eagles coaches
Philadelphia Eagles players
San Francisco 49ers players
Seattle Seahawks players
Sportspeople from Butte, Montana